The Napier Cub was an unusual and very large experimental  16-cylinder 'X' pattern liquid-cooled aero engine built by the British engine company D. Napier & Son. The Cub was the only Napier 'X' engine design. First flown on 15 December 1922 in an Avro Aldershot biplane bomber aircraft, the only other application was in the Blackburn Cubaroo. Only six engines of this type were ordered and produced.

Design
The four banks of four cylinders were arranged in a flattened 'X' when viewed from the front. The angle between the upper cylinders was 52.5 degrees, the lower cylinders 127.5 degrees, which gave an angle of 90 degrees between the outer cylinder banks. The cylinders consisted of separate individual steel forgings with welded steel water cooling jackets. The carburettor was situated below the propeller reduction gear at the front of the engine and fed the inlet valves through four inlet manifolds. The valve drive gear, magnetos and pumps were fitted to the rear of the crankcase.

Specifications (Cub)

See also

References

Notes

Bibliography

 Lumsden, Alec. British Piston Engines and their Aircraft. Marlborough, Wiltshire: Airlife Publishing, 2003. .

External links
"Harnessing 1,000 Horse Power" a 1922 Flight article on the Cub

Cub
1910s aircraft piston engines
X engines